John Cotter may refer to:

Mick Cotter, John Francis "Mick" Cotter, (born 1935), Australian politician
John L. Cotter (1911–1999), American archaeologist
John P. Cotter (1911–1993), Justice of the Connecticut Supreme Court
John Cotter of Coppingerstown (fl. 1585), member of Irish Cotter family
John Cotter, fictional character in TV series Fashion House
John Cotter, Australian racing driver and co-owner of M3 Motorsport

See also
Jack Cotter
John Cother (by 1490–1532 or later), English politician
Cotter (surname)